Edward Alexander Bouchet (September 15, 1852 – October 28, 1918) was an American physicist and educator and was the first African American to earn a Ph.D. from any American university, completing his dissertation in physics at Yale in 1876. On the basis of his academic record he was elected to the Phi Beta Kappa Society. In 1874, he became one of the first African Americans to graduate from Yale College.

Although Bouchet was elected to Phi Beta Kappa along with other members of the Yale class of 1874, the official induction did not take place until 1884, when the Yale chapter was reorganized after thirteen years of inactivity. Because of the circumstances, Bouchet was not the first African American elected to Phi Beta Kappa, as many historical accounts state; that honor belongs to George Washington Henderson (University of Vermont). Bouchet was also among the first 20 Americans (of any race) to receive a Ph.D. in physics and was the sixth to earn a Ph.D. in physics from Yale.

Early life

Edward Bouchet was born at home in New Haven, Connecticut, to parents William Francis Bouchet and Susan (Cooley) Bouchet in 1852. His father had been brought to New Haven from Charleston, South Carolina, in 1824 as the enslaved valet of a young plantation owner and Yale student. William Francis was emancipated by his owner when the latter graduated from Yale, and he then went to work as a janitor and later porter at Yale, and served as a deacon of the Temple Street Church, the oldest black church in the city. Edward's mother took in the laundry of Yale students. He was the youngest of four children and the only male. Two of his sisters were Fanny Bouchet Turner and Georgie Bouchet.

During the 1850s and 1860s, there were only three schools in New Haven that accepted black children. Bouchet was enrolled in the Artisan Street Colored School, which had only one teacher, Sarah Wilson. She nurtured Bouchet's academic abilities and aspirations. He attended the New Haven High School from 1866 to 1868 and then Hopkins School from 1868 to 1870, where he was named valedictorian.

Studies
Word of Bouchet's talents reached Philadelphia and Alfred Cope of the Society of Friends and Institute for Colored Youth. Cope wanted Bouchet to teach at the Center after finishing his studies and paid for his time at Yale in order to facilitate this partnership. Bouchet ranked sixth in his class on graduation from Yale. Bouchet's doctoral thesis centered on measuring the refractive indices of various glasses.

Professional life
 Earning his PhD, Bouchet was unable to find a university teaching or research facility position due to racial discrimination. He moved to Philadelphia in 1876 and took a position at the Institute for Colored Youth (now Cheyney University of Pennsylvania), where he taught physics and chemistry for the next 26 years. He resigned in 1902 at the height of the W. E. B. Du Bois-Booker T. Washington controversy over the need for an industrial vs. collegiate education for black people.

Bouchet spent the next 14 years holding a variety of jobs around the country. Between 1905 and 1908, he was director of academics at St. Paul's Normal and Industrial School in Lawrenceville, Virginia (presently, St. Paul's College). He was then principal and teacher at Lincoln High School in Gallipolis, Ohio, from 1908 to 1913, when arteriosclerosis forced him to retire.

Death
Upon retirement, Bouchet moved back to New Haven. He died there in his childhood home at 94 Bradley Street in 1918 after a six-week illness caused by high blood pressure. He never married and had no children. He was buried in an unmarked grave at New Haven's Evergreen Cemetery. In 1998, Yale University placed a headstone on Bouchet's grave.

Legacy
The American Physical Society (APS Physics) confers the Edward A. Bouchet Award on some of the nation's outstanding physicists for their contribution to physics.

The Edward Bouchet Abdus Salam Institute (EBASI) was founded in 1988 by the late Nobel Laureate, Professor Abdus Salam, under the direction of the founding chairman Charles S. Brown. The current chair of EBASI is Professor Milton Dean Slaughter.

In 2005, Yale and Howard University founded the Edward A. Bouchet Graduate Honor Society in his name.

Notes

References

1852 births
1918 deaths
Scientists from New Haven, Connecticut
Yale University alumni
Hopkins School alumni
Science teachers
American physicists
African-American scientists
Connecticut Republicans
20th-century African-American people
African-American physicists